Gunich (also Romanized as Gūnīch and Govānīch; also known as Gūnīj) is a village in Karvandar Rural District, in the Central District of Khash County, Sistan and Baluchestan Province, Iran. At the 2006 census, its population was 277, in 54 families.

References 

Populated places in Khash County